Charles Purdy (24 November 1905 – 25 January 1982) was a New Zealand boxer who competed in the 1924 Summer Olympics.

In 1924 he was eliminated in the first round of the lightweight class after losing his fight to Frenchman Jean Tholey. The result of the fight was controversial, Purdy, the crowd and one of the judges believing Purdy had clearly won the fight; the other judge and the French referee giving the fight to Tholey.

After the Games he travelled to Dublin where he won the Irish welterweight title.

He later moved to Australia; in 1929 losing the welterweight championship of Australia to Wally Hancock in Sydney by being knocked out for the first time; he was 10 st 2 lb (58.3 kg).

A 1935 report from Sydney said that Charles Francis Purdy a professional boxer had divorced his wife; on their wedding night she threw a glass at him and gashed his forehead, and he attended hospital five times due to her violence.

He is remembered by the Charlie Purdy Cup of the Auckland Boxing Association, and for his weaving:
Ralph Aitken "weaved and ducked like a Charlie Purdy."
Billy Parris "used Charlie Purdy’s famous weave."

References

External links

Kiwis With Gloves On by Brian F O'Brien, published 1960, Reed.

1905 births
1982 deaths
New Zealand male boxers
Lightweight boxers
Olympic boxers of New Zealand
Boxers at the 1924 Summer Olympics
Australian male boxers
New Zealand professional boxing champions